Wigwag is a nickname for a type of railroad grade crossing signal once common in North America, referring to its pendulum-like motion that signaled the approach of a train. The device is generally credited to Albert Hunt, a mechanical engineer at Southern California's Pacific Electric (PE) interurban streetcar railroad, who invented it in 1909 for safer railroad grade crossings. The term should not be confused with its usage in Britain, where "wigwag" generally refers to alternate flashing lights, such as those found at modern level crossings.

Rationale
Soon after the advent of the automobile, travel speeds were increasing and the popularity of enclosed cars made the concept of "stop, look, and listen" at railroad crossings difficult. Fatalities at crossings were increasing. Though the idea of automatic grade crossing protection was not new, no one had invented a fail-safe, universally recognized system. In those days, many crossings were protected by a watchman who warned of an oncoming train by swinging a red lantern in a side-to-side arc, used universally in the U.S. to signify "stop". This motion is still used today by railroad workers to indicate stop per the General Code of Operating Rules (GCOR) Rule 5.3.1. It was presumed that a mechanical device that mimicked that movement would get the attention of approaching motorists and give an unmistakable warning.

Design

The earliest wigwags used by Pacific Electric, built in the railroad's shops, were gear-driven, but proved difficult to maintain. The final design, first installed in 1914 at a busy crossing near Long Beach, California, utilized alternating electromagnets pulling on an iron armature. There was a red light in the center of the target, and with each swing of the target a mechanical gong sounded.

The new model, combining sight, motion and sound, was dubbed the magnetic flagman, and was manufactured by the Magnetic Signal Company of Los Angeles, California, though it is unclear exactly when production began. After the distinctive signals were installed, train and car collisions decreased at PE grade crossings. The signs became so common throughout the area that they were near-icons of Southern California motoring. Their popularity led to Magnetic Signal wigwags appearing at railroad crossings across the United States—including on Alaska's Copper River and Northwestern Railway and on several Hawaiian railroads—and across Canada, Mexico, and as far away as Australia. There are also photographs of the Magnetic Flagman in use in Europe.

Three mechanically-identical versions were produced. The upper-quadrant model was mounted directly atop a steel pole and waved the target above the motor box. It was intended for use where space was limited. Since the target could not serve as the pendulum, a cast iron counterweight opposite the target was used.  Accurate computer-generated animation of that type of signal can be seen in the 2006 movie, Cars. The lower-quadrant version waved the target below the motor box and was intended to be cantilevered from a pole, over road traffic (see above photos). Some railroads, especially in the north-western US, mounted their lower quadrant versions directly on top of a tall steel pole similar to the upper quadrant signal. They were placed on one side of the road, or on an island in the center of the road, and often had crossbucks fastened on top of the motor box.  A lower quadrant signal of that kind is seen in the 2004 film Lemony Snicket's A Series of Unfortunate Events.

Though Magnetic Signal manufactured a steel pole and cast-iron base for the purpose (which served as a cabinet for backup batteries and relays), PE often mounted the cantilevers on the wooden poles that also supported the overhead catenary providing power for streetcars. That rendered batteries unnecessary, since any failure of PE's generators resulted in a shutdown of the railway. It also permitted the relays to be housed in a separate, inexpensive cabinet, reducing the cost of the installation.

The third and least common version was a pole-mounted lower-quadrant signal, with the motor box fixed to the top of an octagonal steel frame that surrounded the target, presumably to protect both banner and motor box from being damaged by road vehicles. Dubbed the "peach basket" because of the protective framework, the apparatus was crowned by another visual warning, the traditional X-shaped "RAILROAD CROSSING" sign, or crossbucks. The majority of peach baskets were used by the Union Pacific Railroad. One version of the signal had the lower stripe on the banner replaced with the word stop that was lighted.  When the signal was at rest, the words were hidden behind a screen that was painted to look like the missing stripe.  They were either mounted on an island in the center of the road or on the side of the road.

The Magnetic Flagman wigwag waves its target using large, black electromagnets pulling against an iron armature. Sliding contacts switch the current from one magnet to the other. Each Magnetic Flagman includes a builder's plate (bottom center) detailing patent dates and power requirements.

There were a few other models that were either manufactured by Magnetic Signal or customized by the different railroads. Some examples included two signals on the same pole for different traffic approaches, a circular upper quadrant signal in which the target swung in a circular frame, and three-position signals where the target was hidden behind a sign when the signal was inactive. The Norfolk and Western Railway decided to make a change in which the motion-limiting bumpers were placed on the front of the signal instead of inside at the rear, so that the torque on the armature was reduced. They also had unique lights on their banners.

 
Any version could be ordered to operate using the railroad signal standard of 8 volts DC (VDC) current, or the 600 VDC used to power streetcars and electric locomotives, with little more than a change in the electromagnets. Most, if not all, of the 600 VDC units were used by PE. With the conversion to diesel power after PE sold its passenger operations in 1953, those 600 VDC wigwags were gradually converted to 8 VDC units. There were also some 110 volt AC models of Magnetic Flagman used on several railroads, including Norfolk and Western, Winston-Salem Southbound, and the Milwaukee Road. Since AC power did not generate good torque, a coil cutoff device was installed that utilized all four magnets until full motion of the banner was obtained, then two of the magnets went off line and movement was maintained by the remaining two magnets.

Various options were available. One was a round, counterbalancing "sail" for use in windy areas and which was sometimes painted in the same scheme as the main target. A warning light with adjustable housing was offered, as was an "OUT OF ORDER" warning sign that dropped into view if power to the signal was interrupted. There was a rare adjustable turret-style mount for properly aiming the signal if space did not allow the cantilever to fully extend over the roadway. The last known example of the turret-mounted wigwag was removed from service in Gardena, California in 2000, while the versions with the warning signs were mostly shipped to Australia. One surviving example is on display at the Newport Railway Museum in Melbourne, Victoria, and one has been restored and now operates on the Puffing Billy Railway. An example or two of each signal still survive with collectors.

A ruling by the United States Interstate Commerce Commission mandated a change in the target in the early 1930s. It required a change in the paint scheme from solid red to a black cross and border on a white background, but there was no other change until a ruling that required the alternating red lights in use today. That, along with other rules about grade crossing signaling that the wigwags were unable to meet due to their power requirements, rendered them obsolete for new installations after 1949, but grandfathering laws allowed them to remain until the crossings they protected were upgraded. The Magnetic Signal Company was sold to the Griswold Signal Company of Minneapolis shortly after WWII. Production of new signals continued until 1949, and replacement parts until 1960.

The symbol of a black cross on a white background was adopted in the US as the traffic sign warning drivers about an unprotected grade crossing and was incorporated into the corporate logo of the Santa Fe Railroad. It remains in use today, although with a yellow background and the cross rotated 45 degrees into an "X". Some railroads, among them the Louisville and Nashville Railroad, used a concentric black circle on a white background, resembling a bullseye, but that scheme was rare, partly because the L&N used few wigwags.

In modern America and elsewhere 
Few wigwag signals currently remain in place, and the number dwindles as crossings are upgraded and spare parts become scarce. Once broken down and sold (or given away) as scrap as modern flashers took their place, they are now railroad collectibles, commanding a hefty price and winding up in personal collections of railroad officials, train spotters, and other individual collectors. Magnetic Flagman made in Minneapolis, Minnesota after production was moved from Los Angeles are especially rare and are valued by collectors.

There are only 17 railroad crossings with at least one wigwag remaining in the United States as of 2022. Of the 17 remaining, 14 are in California. The other three examples are located in Marion, Illinois, Pullman, Washington and the Dunthorpe neighborhood of Portland, Oregon. This is stark contrast from Federal Railroad Administration data from 2004, showing there were 1,098 railroad crossings in the United States having one or more wigwags as their warning device. Of those 1,098 crossings having wigwags, 398 were in California, 117 in Wisconsin, 97 in Illinois, 66 in Texas and 45 in Kansas. The 2004 data showed a total of 44 states have at least one railroad crossing having a wigwag as its warning device. A previous FRA publication from 1983 showed 2,618 crossings equipped with wigwags.

The last wigwag on a main rail line, a Magnetic Flagman upper-quadrant at a rural crossing in Delhi, Colorado on the BNSF Railway, was removed in March 2021. Until destroyed by a truck in April 2004, a lower-quadrant Magnetic Flagman wigwag protected a private crossing of a BNSF line hidden from public view by a sound barrier in Pittsburg, California. The wigwag, the last "Model 10" in active use, was replaced by standard highway flashers. The Model 10 was distinguished by its short, low-hanging cantilever and use of crossbucks mounted higher than the cantilever. They were almost exclusively used by the Santa Fe, although there were also a few of this model on the Southern Pacific. In 2011–12, working replica wigwags were installed at Disney California Adventure Park in Anaheim, California along the Red Car Trolley as well as show wigwags that were placed in Radiator Springs Racers.

Anaheim had a working signal along the Union Pacific Costa Mesa branch at Lemon and Santa Ana Streets before being removed on February 25, 2019. This same signal may have been featured in the 1922 Magnetic Flagman catalog.

Collector and notable film director, Chris M. Allport owns and operates a restored, lower-quadrant Magnetic Flagman (made in Minneapolis) wigwag at his studio in Los Angeles, California.

A single lower-quadrant wigwag in the industrial city of Vernon, California, once protected a crossing on 49th Street with eight separate tracks on the BNSF Harbor Subdivision. A link between downtown Los Angeles and the ports of Los Angeles and Long Beach, this line currently sees less traffic since the completion of the more direct Alameda Corridor between downtown and the harbor. This project eliminated many at-grade crossings along Alameda Street and a number of Southern Pacific wigwags remaining from the PE era. Those remaining protect crossings of lightly used spur lines primarily in California and Wisconsin, the latter state featuring a different signal produced by Bryant-Zinc purchased by the Railroad Supply Company, which later became the Western Railroad Supply Company (WRRS).

The signal was removed sometime in late April 2020. Its removal and that of the Anaheim signal the previous year marked the end of Southern California wigwags still in revenue service.

Wigwags manufactured by WRRS and its predecessors were once numerous in the Midwest, with almost every town using them to protect their main crossings. The most common model was called the Autoflag #5. They functioned in much the same way as the Magnetic Flagmen. They utilized alternating electromagnets to swing a shaft with an attached illuminated banner. Bells were not integral to the devices as with the Magnetic Flagmen. They employed standard bells that were used on other types of signals, and mounted either to the mast or to a bracket on the top of the center harp style, as in the Devil's Lake, WI photo.

Autoflag #5s were widely used on the Chicago & North Western (C&NW), Chicago, Burlington & Quincy (CB&Q), Illinois Central, Soo Line and the Milwaukee Road Railroads. A few were also used on the Louisville & Nashville and the Gulf, Mobile & Ohio (GM&O) as well as other roads in the US and Canada. Most of these wigwags were removed in the 1970-1980s as crossings were updated. They were made in both a lower quadrant style and a center harp style similar to the Magnetic Flagman's peachbasket style. Early on, there were Autoflag  #5s that would hold the banner behind a shield much like the Magnetic Flagman disappearing banner-style.  These were replaced as time went on with the standard two-position banner that hung vertically when not energized. Several railroad, such as the GM&O and CB&Q, had a second light below the main light on the banner. This served as a second reserve light in case of failure of both bulbs in the main light and as a signal maintainers' warning of a burned-out bulb without having to climb up and open the main light to check each bulb. If the secondary light was illuminated, there was an issue with burned out bulbs in the main light.

Wigwags were also manufactured by Union Switch and Signal (US&S). They were primarily used in the northeastern US, with a few in Florida, although the Frisco had some in the Great Plains. An example was also pictured in a review of Hawaiian sugar cane railroads from the 1940s. They were manufactured in both a disappearing banner style in the East and standard two-position in the Great Plains.  While there are a few examples in museums, the sole surviving US&S wigwag in service in the US is a two-position style in Joplin, MO on an ex-Frisco industrial spur. It was not destroyed in the May, 2011 Joplin tornado, being a few blocks outside the damage path. These were a bit different in design from the Autoflag #5 and the Magnetic Flagman. The swing of the banner was produced through a drive shaft. Some of them, particularly on the Boston & Maine Railroad, had chase lights mounted above the banner that simulated the movement of the banner. The last one of this type with the chase lights was removed in 1985 and US&S wigwags were thought to have disappeared from the USA until the discovery of the specimen in Joplin. There are a number of US&S wigwags that have been preserved and restored by museums.

US&S and WRRS wigwags were also used by the CPR on its Canadian lines. There were two wig-wags in service in Canada, located on the CN CASO sub near Tilbury, Ontario. Both were WRRS Autoflag #5s with disappearing banners. Disappearing banners were the only style of wigwag approved for use in Canada. They were slated to be removed in early 2009, although they were still in place as of November 2009. In 2011, the CASO sub was abandoned and the wigwags were removed.

The wigwags at the crossing that mark the location of the western terminus of the BNSF Railway (successor to the Santa Fe) in Point Richmond, CA became pawns in a fight over local control in 2001 when BNSF said it was going to remove them once they installed more modern devices, after the state's transportation authority pressured it to upgrade the crossing. Nevertheless, in July 2019 the two upper wig wags were put operative again after the Richmond community raised funds ($2,000) to restore the devices, which had been out of use for 18 years. The two upper-quadrant wigwags are the last of their kind paired together in active use. Both wigwags remain as non-operative decorations at the crossing, coexisting with the modern gates, red lights and bells. In the interest of safety, information signs were posted at the wigwags stating that the wigwags are non-operational. The ability to be activated by trains was retained, but only for special events.

On the episode of American Restoration aired on April 16, 2013, a pair of WRRS Autoflag #5 wigwag signals were restored for the Nevada Northern Railway Museum in Ely, Nevada.

In Australia, a wigwag is left preserved along the abandoned Victor Harbor railway line in Mount Barker, South Australia.

Preservation 
Several wig-wag signals have been preserved at heritage railroads and museums, including, but not necessarily limited to the following:

 Arizona Railway Museum
 California State Railroad Museum
 Colfax Railroad Museum
 Colorado Railroad Museum
 Conway Scenic Railroad
 East Troy Electric Railroad Museum
 Edaville Railroad
 Elgin County Railway Museum
 Heart of Dixie Railroad Museum
 Hoosier Valley Railroad Museum
 Illinois Railway Museum
 Mid-Continent Railway Museum
 Monticello Railway Museum
 Nevada Northern Railway Museum
 North Carolina Transportation Museum
 Orange Empire Railway Museum
 Oregon Electric Railway Museum
 National Railway Museum, Port Adelaide
 Rosenberg Railroad Museum
 San Luis Obispo Railroad Museum
 Tennessee Valley Railroad Museum
 Virginia Museum of Transportation
 Western Pacific Railroad Museum
 Whippany Railway Museum
 Old Prairie Town
 Texas Transport Museum

See also
 Grade crossing signals
 Crossbuck

References

External links

 Dan's wigwag site
 Southern California Railway Museum
 Last Wig-Wag in Vernon Located on 49th Street (archived, 4 Dec 2004)
 Link to information about the Richmond wigwags
 Going Wiggy over Wig-Wags By Jim Mallory on San Francisco Bay Crossings (archived, 15 Nov 2002)
 Wig Wag archive via Google Maps
 Wigwag crossings on YouTube

Railway safety
Railway signaling in the United States
Railway signalling in Australia
History of Los Angeles
Level crossings